The 1901–02 Princeton Tigers men's ice hockey season was the 3rd season of play for the program.

Season
After a slow start Princeton won five consecutive games to finish with a respectable record. The team did not play any 'home' games as there was no available ice rink near its campus. Instead the Tigers played a majority of their games at the St. Nicholas Rink (a common practice for many colleges at the time).

Roster

Standings

Schedule and Results

|-
!colspan=12 style=";" | Regular Season

References

Princeton Tigers men's ice hockey seasons
Princeton
Princeton
Princeton
Princeton